The 1931 New Mexico Lobos football team represented the University of New Mexico as a member of the Border Conference during the 1931 college football season. In their first season under head coach Chuck Riley, the Lobos compiled an overall record of 3–3–1 record with a mark of 1–1–1 against conference opponents, finished second in the Border Conference, and outscored opponents by a total of 80 to 70.

Coach Riley arrived in Albuquerque in August 1931. Riley had played football at Notre Dame and served as an assistant coach on the 1930 Loyola Lions football team. Riley brought with him former Notre Dame center Joe Nash as an assistant coach.

Schedule

References

New Mexico
New Mexico Lobos football seasons
New Mexico Lobos football